Orlando Ramos is an American politician serving as a member of the Massachusetts House of Representatives from the 9th Hampden district. Elected in November 2020, he assumed office on January 6, 2021.

Early life and education 
Ramos was born and raised in Springfield, Massachusetts. After graduating from Roger L Putnam Vocational-Technical High School, he earned an associate degree from Springfield Technical Community College, a Bachelor of Arts in public policy from the University of Massachusetts Amherst, and a Master of Public Administration from Westfield State University.

Career 
Ramos worked as an intern in the office of Governor Deval Patrick. He was later elected to the Springfield City Council, where he introduced legislation to improve infrastructure in the city. He was elected to the Massachusetts House of Representatives in November 2020 and assumed office on January 6, 2021.

Personal life 
Ramos is Puerto Rican.

References 

Living people
Democratic Party members of the Massachusetts House of Representatives
People from Springfield, Massachusetts
University of Massachusetts Amherst alumni
Westfield State University alumni
Hispanic and Latino American state legislators in Massachusetts
21st-century American politicians
American politicians of Puerto Rican descent
Year of birth missing (living people)
Massachusetts city council members